List of £1 banknotes, bills, or coins, include:

Current currencies
Sterling
British brass £1 coin and gold sovereign
Royal Bank of Scotland £1 note
Egyptian LE 1 coin and note
Falklands £1 coin
Gibraltarian £1 coin
Guernsey £1 coin and note
Manx £1 coin
Jersey £1 coin and note
South Sudanese £1 SSP coin
Sudanese LS 1 coin
Saint Helena £1 coin and note

Obsolete currencies
Australian £A 1 note
Bahamian £1 note
Bermudian £1 note
Biafran £1 note
British West African 20/– note
Canadian £1 note
Cypriot £C 1 note
Fijian £1 note
Gambian £1 note
Ghanaian £1 note
Irish pound
Series A IR£1 note
Series B IR£1 note
Irish IR£1 coin
Israeli IL1 note and coin
Jamaican £1 note
Libyan £L1 note
Maltese £M 1 note and coin
New Brunswick £1 note
Newfoundland £1 note
New Guinea £1 note
New Zealand £NZ 1 note
Nigerian £1 note
Nova Scotian £1 note
Oceanian £1 note
Palestianian £P1 note
Prince Edward Island £1 note
Rhodesia and Nyasaland £1 note
Rhodesian £1 note
Southern Rhodesian £1 note
Malawian £1 note
Zambian £1 note
Solomon Islands £1 note
South African £SA 1 note
South West African £1 note
Thirteen Colonies:
 Connecticut £1 bill
 Delawarean £1 bill
 Georgian £1 bill
 Maryland £1 bill
 Massachusettsan £1 bill
 New Hampshire £1 bill
 New Jerseyan £1 bill
 New York £1 bill
 North Carolinian £1 bill
 Pennsylvanian £1 bill
 Rhode Island £1 bill
 South Carolinian £1 bill
 Virginian £1 bill
Tongan £1 note
Western Samoan £1 note

See also
 List of £5 banknotes and coins
 List of £10

Currency
Numismatics